Sonepur also known as Sonpur State, was one of the princely states of India during the period of the British Raj. Its ruler was entitled to a nine gun salute. Formerly it was placed under the Central India Agency, but in 1905 it was transferred to the Eastern States Agency. Its capital was Sonepur, the only significant town in the area. The former state's territory is in the present-day Subarnapur district, Odisha.

History
The Sonepur state was founded in 1650 when the fourth Chauhan ruler of Sambalpur Madhukar Dev, conquered the region from the Bhanja rulers of Boudh and entrusted it to his younger son Madan Gopal who hence became the founder of the Chauhan dynasty branch of Sonepur.

The state came under the control of the British Empire post the Maratha defeat and later the king Niladhar Singh Deo was awarded with titles for services rendered to the British during the Sambalpur uprising.  

After Indian independence, Sonepur's last ruler acceded to the newly independent Dominion of India, on 1 January 1948 with the state forming much of the present day Subarnapur district.

Rulers

Ruling Chiefs of Sonepur

Titular

See also
Eastern States Agency
Political integration of India

References

External links
Sonepur State – Heritage of Indian Stamps

Subarnapur district
History of Odisha
Princely states of Odisha
States and territories disestablished in 1948
Rajputs
1650 establishments in India
1948 disestablishments in India